Clinton Headlam (born 16 November 1929) is a Jamaican cricketer. He played in four first-class matches for the Jamaican cricket team in 1957/58 and 1958/59.

See also
 List of Jamaican representative cricketers

References

External links
 

1929 births
Living people
Jamaican cricketers
Jamaica cricketers
People from Saint Andrew Parish, Jamaica